Christopher FitzSimons Allison (born March 5, 1927) is a retired American Anglican bishop and an author. He is known for his role in the Anglican realignment, which led to his participation in the controversial consecration in 2000 of two bishops opposed to the blessing of same-sex unions by the Episcopal Church, that took place in Singapore. He resides in Georgetown, South Carolina, where he serves as a retired bishop of the Anglican Diocese of South Carolina in the Anglican Church in North America since 2017.

Education and career
Allison was born and raised in Columbia, South Carolina. He attended the University of the South and, after having his studies briefly interrupted by service in the United States Army during World War II after which he was discharged with the rank of Master Sergeant, he received a bachelor of arts degree in 1949. He then studied at Virginia Theological Seminary, from which he graduated with a Bachelor of Divinity degree in 1952. He was ordained deacon in June 1952 and priest in May 1953. Allison later studied at Oxford University and received the Doctor of Philosophy degree in 1956. He then taught church history at the School of Theology at the University of the South and at Virginia Theological Seminary.

He served as rector of Grace Episcopal Church in New York City before being elected as a bishop of the Episcopal Diocese of South Carolina. He was the coadjutor bishop of the Diocese of South Carolina in 1980, becoming the twelfth diocesan bishop on January 2, 1982. He retired in 1990 but has continued preaching, speaking, and writing.

Controversial consecrations
In 2000, Allison participated in the consecrations of Charles Murphy and John Rogers, who were both priests in the Episcopal Church, as missionary bishops to the United States from the Anglican churches of Rwanda and Southeast Asia. Bishops Murphy and Rogers provided leadership to the conservative Anglican Mission in America, in which Allison, although remaining a member of the Episcopal Church, has also been active.

These consecrations, which occurred in Singapore, were controversial in the Episcopal Church as they were an act of protest against the church's blessing of same-sex unions but were also considered to be a breach of church unity. Other consecrators were Emmanuel Kolini, Archbishop of the Province of Rwanda, Moses Tay, Archbishop of the Province of South East Asia, John Rucyahana, Bishop of Shyira (Rwanda), Alex D. Dickson, retired Bishop of West Tennessee, and David Pytches, former Bishop of Chile, Bolivia and Peru and now a vicar in England.

Writings
Among Allison's books are The Rise of Moralism: The Proclamation of the Gospel from Hooker to Baxter (New York: The Seabury Press, 1966);  The Cruelty of Heresy: An Affirmation of Christian Orthodoxy (Harrisburg, PA: Morehouse, 1994); "Guilt, Anger, and God: The Patterns of Our Discontents" (New York: The Seabury Press, 1972); "Fear, Love, and Worship" (published prior to 1972). His most recent book, Trust in an Age of Arrogance, was released in 2009. Allison's books argue strongly for Christian orthodoxy, and specifically for Christian pastors and teachers to be focused upon grace and justification by faith alone as the key doctrines of the Christian Church.

References

External links
 

 

1927 births
Living people
Episcopal bishops of South Carolina
Evangelical Anglican bishops
Bishops of the Anglican Church in North America
Writers from Columbia, South Carolina
Virginia Theological Seminary faculty
21st-century American clergy
Anglican realignment people